Zinc phosphide (Zn3P2) is an inorganic chemical compound. It is a grey solid, although commercial samples are often dark or even black. It is used as a rodenticide. Zn3P2 is a II-V semiconductor with a direct band gap of 1.5 eV and may have applications in photovoltaic cells. A second compound exists in the zinc-phosphorus system, zinc diphosphide (ZnP2).

Synthesis and reactions
Zinc phosphide can be prepared by the reaction of zinc with phosphorus; however, for critical applications, additional processing to remove arsenic compounds may be needed.
6 Zn  +   P4   →  2 Zn3P2

Another method of preparation include reacting tri-n-octylphosphine with dimethylzinc.

Zinc phosphide reacts with water to produce phosphine (PH3) and zinc hydroxide (Zn(OH)2):

Zn3P2  +  6 H2O   →   2 PH3  +  3 Zn(OH)2

Structure
Zn3P2 has a room-temperature tetragonal form that converts to a cubic form at around 845 °C. In the room-temperature form there are discrete P atoms, zinc atoms are tetrahedrally coordinated and phosphorus six coordinate, with zinc atoms at 6 of the vertices of a distorted cube.

The crystalline structure of zinc phosphide is very similar to that of cadmium arsenide (Cd3As2), zinc arsenide (Zn3As2) and cadmium phosphide (Cd3P2). These compounds of the Zn-Cd-P-As quaternary system exhibit full continuous solid-solution.

Applications

Photovoltaics 
Zinc phosphide is an ideal candidate for thin film photovoltaic applications, for it has strong optical absorption and an almost ideal band gap (1.5eV). In addition to this, both zinc and phosphorus are found abundantly in the earth's crust, meaning that material extraction cost is low compared with that of other thin film photovoltaics. Both zinc and phosphorus are also nontoxic, which is not the case for other common commercial thin film photovoltaics, like cadmium telluride.

Researchers at the University of Alberta were the first to successfully synthesize colloidal zinc phosphide. Before this, researchers were able to create efficient solar cells from bulk zinc phosphide, but their fabrication required temperatures greater than 850 °C or complicated vacuum deposition methods. By contrast, colloidal zinc phosphide nanoparticles, contained in a zinc phosphide “ink”, allows for inexpensive, easy large-scale production, by means of slot-die coating or spray coating.

The testing and development of these zinc phosphide thin films is still in its early stages, but early results have been positive. Prototype heterojunction devices fabricated from zinc phosphide nanoparticle ink exhibited a rectification ratio of 600 and photosensitivity with an on/off ratio near 100. These are both acceptable suitability benchmarks for solar cells. Development still needs to be made on optimizing the nanoparticle ink formation and device architecture before commercialization is possible, but commercial spray-on zinc phosphide solar cells may be possible within ten years.

Pest control

Rodenticide
Metal phosphides have been used as rodenticides. A mixture of food and zinc phosphide is left where the rodents can eat it. The acid in the digestive system of the rodent reacts with the phosphide to generate toxic phosphine gas. This method of vermin control has possible use in places where rodents are immune to other common poisons. Other pesticides similar to zinc phosphide are aluminium phosphide and calcium phosphide.

 Zn3P2 + 6H+ → 3Zn++ + PH3 ↑

Zinc phosphide is typically added to rodent baits in amount of around 0.75-2%. Such baits have a strong, pungent garlic-like odor characteristic of phosphine liberated by hydrolysis. The odor attracts rodents, but has a repulsive effect on other animals; However, birds, notably wild turkeys, are not sensitive to the smell. The baits have to contain sufficient amount of zinc phosphide in sufficiently attractive food in order to kill rodents in a single serving; a sublethal dose may cause aversion towards zinc phosphide baits encountered by surviving rodents in the future.

Rodenticide-grade zinc phosphide usually comes as a black powder containing 75% of zinc phosphide and 25% of antimony potassium tartrate, an emetic to cause vomiting if the material is accidentally ingested by humans or domestic animals. However, it is still effective against rats, mice, guinea pigs and rabbits, none of which have a vomiting reflex.

Pest control in New Zealand
The New Zealand Environmental Protection Authority has approved the import and manufacture of Microencapsulated Zinc Phosphide (MZP Paste) for the ground control of possums. The application was made by Pest Tech Limited, with support from Connovation Ltd, Lincoln University and the Animal Health Board. It will be used as an additional vertebrate poison in certain situations. Unlike 1080 poison, it cannot be used for aerial application.

Safety
Zinc phosphide is highly toxic, especially when ingested or inhaled. The reason for its toxicity is the release of phosphorus compounds, usually phosphine, when it reacts with water and acids. Phosphine is very toxic and, with trace amounts of P2H4, pyrophoric. Phosphine is also denser than air and may remain close to the ground without sufficient ventilation.

References

External links
 Zinc Phosphide Pesticide Information Profile - Extension Toxicology Network
 EPA Proposed Risk Mitigation Decision for Nine Rodenticides

 Zinc phosphide properties and use in Michigan
 MD0173 - Pesticides in the military

Phosphides
phosphide
Rodenticides
II-V semiconductors
II-V compounds
Foul-smelling chemicals